Perihelion is the point of closest approach to the Sun of a body orbiting the Sun.

Perihelion may also refer to:
 Perihelion: The Prophecy, a 1993 role-playing video game for the Amiga computer
 Perihelion Software, a British software company
 Isaac Asimov's Robot City: Perihelion, a 1988 novel by William F. Wu
Perihelion, a short story by Dan Abnett for the Warhammer 40,000 universe